The 2008–09 Sacramento Kings season is the 64th season of the franchise, 60th in the National Basketball Association (NBA), 24th in Sacramento. After they traded away Ron Artest to the Houston Rockets in exchange for former Kings guard Bobby Jackson, and recently drafted Donte Greene, a 2009 first–round draft pick and cash considerations during the offseason, the Kings have struggled all season and they finished with a franchise–worst 17–65 record surpassed their franchise record mark set in the 1989–90 season of 23–59 record and also team suffered their first 60–loss season in Kings' franchise history.

After a slow start into the season, on December 15, 2008, just ten days before Christmas, the Kings fired their head coach Reggie Theus and their assistant head coach Chuck Person after an 6–18 start to the season and replaced by assistant coach Kenny Natt on the interim basis for the rest of the season.

At the trade deadline in midseason after the All-Star break they traded away former two–time All-Star Brad Miller and John Salmons to the Chicago Bulls in exchange for Andrés Nocioni, Drew Gooden, Michael Ruffin, and Cedric Simmons and future draft picks. Kings' guard Kevin Martin played only 51 games due to ankle injuries and this will be his final full season with the team before being traded to the Houston Rockets, in the trade deadline following the season.

Also, following the season, interim head coach Natt and their four assistant coaches Rex Kalamian, former Kings' player Randy Brown, Bubba Burrage, and Jason Hamm were all fired on April 24, 2009, just nine days after the regular season was concluded with an franchise–low 17–win single season Kings' record and he was replaced by former Phoenix Suns and Seattle SuperSonics (now, Oklahoma City Thunder) head coach Paul Westphal on June 9, 2009.

Key dates
 June 26: The 2008 NBA draft took place in New York City, New York.
 July 1: The free agency period started.

Draft picks

Roster

Roster Notes
 Ike Diogu holds American citizenship, but he represents Nigeria in international play.

Regular season

Standings

Game log

|- bgcolor="#ffcccc"
| 1
| October 29
| @ Minnesota
| 
| John Salmons (24)
| Spencer Hawes (14)
| John Salmons (8)
| Target Center17,820
| 0–1
|- bgcolor="#ffcccc"
| 2
| October 31
| @ Miami
| 
| Quincy Douby, John Salmons (14)
| Spencer Hawes (11)
| John Salmons (3)
| American Airlines Arena19,600
| 0–2

|- bgcolor="#ffcccc"
| 3
| November 1
| @ Orlando
| 
| Kevin Martin (31)
| Jason Thompson (5)
| Beno Udrih (5)
| Amway Arena16,704
| 0–3
|- bgcolor="#ffcccc"
| 4
| November 3
| @ Philadelphia
| 
| Jason Thompson (17)
| Spencer Hawes (8)
| Jason Thompson (5)
| Wachovia Center10,100
| 0–4
|- bgcolor="#bbffbb"
| 5
| November 5
| Memphis
| 
| Kevin Martin (33)
| Mikki Moore (11)
| Beno Udrih (6)
| ARCO Arena13,685
| 1–4
|- bgcolor="#bbffbb"
| 6
| November 7
| Minnesota
| 
| Kevin Martin (26)
| Brad Miller (10)
| Kevin Martin (6)
| ARCO Arena10,592
| 2–4
|- bgcolor="#bbffbb"
| 7
| November 9
| Golden State
| 
| Kevin Martin (27)
| Spencer Hawes (11)
| Brad Miller (6)
| ARCO Arena12,090
| 3–4
|- bgcolor="#ffcccc"
| 8
| November 11
| Detroit
| 
| Spencer Hawes (19)
| Jason Thompson (9)
| John Salmons (7)
| ARCO Arena11,423
| 3–5
|- bgcolor="#bbffbb"
| 9
| November 12
| @ L.A. Clippers
| 
| Beno Udrih (30)
| Brad Miller, Jason Thompson (11)
| Brad Miller (8)
| Staples Center13,266
| 4–5
|- bgcolor="#ffcccc"
| 10
| November 14
| Phoenix
| 
| John Salmons (21)
| Brad Miller (11)
| Brad Miller (7)
| ARCO Arena12,810
| 4–6
|- bgcolor="#ffcccc"
| 11
| November 16
| San Antonio
| 
| John Salmons (31)
| Brad Miller, Mikki Moore (8)
| Beno Udrih, Brad Miller (4)
| ARCO Arena11,699
| 4–7
|- bgcolor="#ffcccc"
| 12
| November 18
| @ Memphis
| 
| John Salmons (18)
| Jason Thompson (9)
| Beno Udrih, Brad Miller (5)
| FedExForum10,834
| 4–8
|- bgcolor="#bbffbb"
| 13
| November 19
| @ New Orleans
| 
| John Salmons (29)
| Brad Miller (8)
| Beno Udrih (7)
| New Orleans Arena15,533
| 5–8
|- bgcolor="#ffcccc"
| 14
| November 21
| Portland
| 
| Jason Thompson (19)
| Jason Thompson (12)
| Bobby Brown (7)
| ARCO Arena12,056
| 5–9
|- bgcolor="#ffcccc"
| 15
| November 23
| @ L.A. Lakers
| 
| John Salmons (24)
| Spencer Hawes (8)
| Bobby Brown, Beno Udrih (7)
| Staples Center18,997
| 5–10
|- bgcolor="#ffcccc"
| 16
| November 24
| @ Portland
| 
| John Salmons (20)
| Brad Miller, Jason Thompson (6)
| Beno Udrih (8)
| Rose Garden20,467
| 5–11
|- bgcolor="#ffcccc"
| 17
| November 26
| New Jersey
| 
| John Salmons (38)
| Brad Miller (13)
| Beno Udrih (10)
| ARCO Arena11,650
| 5–12
|- bgcolor="#ffcccc"
| 18
| November 28
| @ Utah
| 
| John Salmons (20)
| Donté Greene, Spencer Hawes (6)
| Beno Udrih, Brad Miller (6)
| EnergySolutions Arena19,911
| 5–13
|- bgcolor="#ffcccc"
| 19
| November 29
| Dallas
| 
| Beno Udrih (13)
| Beno Udrih (9)
| Beno Udrih (7)
| ARCO Arena12,650
| 5–14

|- bgcolor="#ffcccc"
| 20
| December 2
| Utah
| 
| Kevin Martin (22)
| Brad Miller (9)
| Spencer Hawes (6)
| ARCO Arena10,798
| 5–15
|- bgcolor="#ffcccc"
| 21
| December 6
| Denver
| 
| John Salmons (22)
| Jason Thompson (15)
| Beno Udrih (4)
| ARCO Arena12,322
| 5–16
|- bgcolor="#bbffbb"
| 22
| December 9
| L.A. Lakers
| 
| John Salmons, Francisco García (21)
| Spencer Hawes (9)
| Brad Miller, Beno Udrih (5)
| ARCO Arena16,068
| 6–16
|- bgcolor="#ffcccc"
| 23
| December 12
| @ L.A. Lakers
| 
| John Salmons (26)
| Jason Thompson (8)
| Beno Udrih (7)
| Staples Center18,997
| 6–17
|- bgcolor="#ffcccc"
| 24
| December 13
| New York
| 
| John Salmons (14)
| Jason Thompson (11)
| Beno Udrih (6)
| ARCO Arena12,155
| 6–18
|- bgcolor="#bbffbb"
| 25
| December 15
| Minnesota
| 
| Francisco García (21)
| Spencer Hawes, Brad Miller (10)
| Bobby Brown (6)
| ARCO Arena10,593
| 7–18
|- bgcolor="#ffcccc"
| 26
| December 16
| @ Portland
| 
| John Salmons (21)
| Mikki Moore (6)
| Beno Udrih (4)
| Rose Garden20,005
| 7–19
|- bgcolor="#ffcccc"
| 27
| December 19
| @ Houston
| 
| John Salmons (26)
| Brad Miller (11)
| John Salmons, Brad Miller, Beno Udrih (3)
| Toyota Center18,271
| 7–20
|- bgcolor="#ffcccc"
| 28
| December 20
| @ New Orleans
| 
| John Salmons (26)
| Jason Thompson (10)
| John Salmons (7)
| New Orleans Arena16,869
| 7–21
|- bgcolor="#ffcccc"
| 29
| December 22
| @ San Antonio
| 
| John Salmons (22)
| Jason Thompson, Francisco García, Spencer Hawes, Brad Miller (6)
| Beno Udrih (4)
| AT&T Center18,372
| 7–22
|- bgcolor="#ffcccc"
| 30
| December 26
| Toronto
| 
| John Salmons, Brad Miller (20)
| Spencer Hawes, Brad Miller (8)
| John Salmons, Beno Udrih, Bobby Brown (4)
| ARCO Arena12,059
| 7–23
|- bgcolor="#ffcccc"
| 31
| December 28
| Boston
| 
| John Salmons (11)
| Mikki Moore (8)
| Beno Udrih (3)
| ARCO Arena16,029
| 7–24
|- bgcolor="#bbffbb"
| 32
| December 30
| L.A. Clippers
| 
| Kevin Martin (20)
| Brad Miller (13)
| John Salmons (6)
| ARCO Arena11,420
| 8–24

|- bgcolor="#ffcccc"
| 33
| January 2
| @ Detroit
| 
| Brad Miller (25)
| Brad Miller (16)
| John Salmons (4)
| The Palace of Auburn Hills22,076
| 8–25
|- bgcolor="#ffcccc"
| 34
| January 3
| @ Indiana
| 
| Kevin Martin (45)
| Bobby Jackson (10)
| Kevin Martin, Brad Miller (6)
| Conseco Fieldhouse12,765
| 8–26
|- bgcolor="#ffcccc"
| 35
| January 5
| @ New Jersey
| 
| Kevin Martin (36)
| Kenny Thomas (8)
| Brad Miller (8)
| Izod Center12,314
| 8–27
|- bgcolor="#ffcccc"
| 36
| January 6
| @ Chicago
| 
| Kevin Martin (29)
| Brad Miller (12)
| Beno Udrih (5)
| United Center18,060
| 8–28
|- bgcolor="#ffcccc"
| 37
| January 9
| Miami
| 
| John Salmons (29)
| Brad Miller (16)
| John Salmons, Brad Miller, Bobby Jackson (4)
| ARCO Arena12,587
| 8–29
|- bgcolor="#bbffbb"
| 38
| January 11
| Dallas
| 
| Kevin Martin (21)
| Spencer Hawes (8)
| Beno Udrih (6)
| ARCO Arena12,294
| 9–29
|- bgcolor="#ffcccc"
| 39
| January 13
| Orlando
| 
| Kevin Martin (30)
| Francisco García (5)
| Francisco García (5)
| ARCO Arena11,168
| 9–30
|- bgcolor="#bbffbb"
| 40
| January 14
| @ Golden State
| 
| Brad Miller (30)
| Brad Miller (22)
| John Salmons, Beno Udrih (7)
| Oracle Arena19,122
| 10–30
|- bgcolor="#ffcccc"
| 41
| January 16
| Milwaukee
| 
| John Salmons, Kevin Martin (24)
| Jason Thompson (11)
| John Salmons (6)
| ARCO Arena11,663
| 10–31
|- bgcolor="#ffcccc"
| 42
| January 20
| @ Denver
| 
| Kevin Martin (25)
| Jason Thompson (11)
| John Salmons, Beno Udrih (5)
| Pepsi Center15,164
| 10–32
|- bgcolor="#ffcccc"
| 43
| January 21
| Washington
| 
| John Salmons, Beno Udrih (24)
| John Salmons, Shelden Williams, Jason Thompson (5)
| John Salmons (5)
| ARCO Arena10,821
| 10–33
|- bgcolor="#ffcccc"
| 44
| January 24
| @ Milwaukee
| 
| Kevin Martin (20)
| Brad Miller (13)
| Brad Miller (9)
| Bradley Center15,379
| 10–34
|- bgcolor="#ffcccc"
| 45
| January 25
| @ Toronto
| 
| John Salmons (21)
| John Salmons (7)
| Beno Udrih (5)
| Air Canada Centre18,127
| 10–35
|- bgcolor="#ffcccc"
| 46
| January 27
| @ Cleveland
| 
| Kevin Martin (35)
| Kevin Martin (7)
| Kevin Martin (7)
| Quicken Loans Arena20,562
| 10–36
|- bgcolor="#ffcccc"
| 47
| January 28
| @ Boston
| 
| John Salmons (22)
| Jason Thompson (11)
| John Salmons (5)
| TD Banknorth Garden18,624
| 10–37
|- bgcolor="#ffcccc"
| 48
| January 30
| Chicago
| 
| Kevin Martin (27)
| Jason Thompson (12)
| Spencer Hawes, Kevin Martin (3)
| ARCO Arena13,356
| 10–38

|- bgcolor="#bbffbb"
| 49
| February 1
| Oklahoma City
| 
| Kevin Martin (37)
| John Salmons (10)
| John Salmons (8)
| ARCO Arena10,817
| 11–38
|- bgcolor="#ffcccc"
| 50
| February 2
| @ Phoenix
| 
| John Salmons (19)
| Spencer Hawes (9)
| Spencer Hawes, Donté Greene, John Salmons, Jason Thompson (2)
| US Airways Center18,422
| 11–39
|- bgcolor="#ffcccc"
| 51
| February 6
| Utah
| 
| Kevin Martin (37)
| Spencer Hawes (8)
| John Salmons (7)
| ARCO Arena17,317
| 11–40
|- bgcolor="#ffcccc"
| 52
| February 8
| @ Oklahoma City
| 
| Beno Udrih (29)
| Beno Udrih, Kevin Martin, Spencer Hawes, Jason Thompson (6)
| John Salmons (11)
| Ford Center18,271
| 11–41
|- bgcolor="#ffcccc"
| 53
| February 10
| @ Dallas
| 
| Kevin Martin (18)
| Bobby Jackson (6)
| John Salmons, Beno Udrih (5)
| American Airlines Center19,667
| 11–42
|- bgcolor="#ffcccc"
| 54
| February 11
| @ Houston
| 
| Kevin Martin (18)
| Spencer Hawes (7)
| Spencer Hawes (6)
| Toyota Center15,626
| 11–43
|- bgcolor="#ffcccc"
| 55
| February 18
| Atlanta
| 
| Kevin Martin (32)
| Spencer Hawes (14)
| Kevin Martin, Beno Udrih, Bobby Jackson (4)
| ARCO Arena11,213
| 11–44
|- bgcolor="#bbffbb"
| 56
| February 20
| @ Memphis
| 
| Kevin Martin (33)
| Jason Thompson (9)
| Beno Udrih (6)
| FedExForum15,036
| 12–44
|- bgcolor="#ffcccc"
| 57
| February 21
| @ Dallas
| 
| Beno Udrih (18)
| Spencer Hawes (9)
| Beno Udrih (7)
| American Airlines Center20,223
| 12–45
|- bgcolor="#ffcccc"
| 58
| February 23
| New Orleans
| 
| Kevin Martin (32)
| Spencer Hawes (14)
| Francisco García (6)
| ARCO Arena11,633
| 12–46
|- bgcolor="#ffcccc"
| 59
| February 25
| Charlotte
| 
| Kevin Martin (27)
| Drew Gooden (13)
| Francisco García, Bobby Jackson (4)
| ARCO Arena10,439
| 12–47
|- bgcolor="#bbffbb"
| 60
| February 27
| L.A. Clippers
| 
| Kevin Martin (20)
| Spencer Hawes (15)
| Francisco García (6)
| ARCO Arena12,846
| 13–47
|- bgcolor="#ffcccc"
| 61
| February 28
| @ Utah
| 
| Kevin Martin (19)
| Jason Thompson (12)
| Andrés Nocioni, Francisco García, Jason Thompson, Spencer Hawes (3)
| EnergySolutions Arena19,911
| 13–48

|- bgcolor="#ffcccc"
| 62
| March 3
| Indiana
| 
| Kevin Martin (21)
| Spencer Hawes, Jason Thompson, Andrés Nocioni (7)
| Bobby Jackson (5)
| ARCO Arena10,748
| 13–49
|- bgcolor="#bbffbb"
| 63
| March 8
| Denver
| 
| Kevin Martin (26)
| Spencer Hawes, Bobby Jackson (8)
| Kevin Martin (8)
| ARCO Arena12,678
| 14–49
|- bgcolor="#ffcccc"
| 64
| March 10
| Oklahoma City
| 
| Spencer Hawes (20)
| Spencer Hawes (10)
| Bobby Jackson (6)
| ARCO Arena10,784
| 14–50
|- bgcolor="#ffcccc"
| 65
| March 13
| Cleveland
| 
| Kevin Martin (34)
| Andrés Nocioni (9)
| Spencer Hawes (4)
| ARCO Arena16,317
| 14–51
|- bgcolor="#ffcccc"
| 66
| March 15
| @ Washington
| 
| Kevin Martin (24)
| Jason Thompson (14)
| Beno Udrih (7)
| Verizon Center15,108
| 14–52
|- bgcolor="#ffcccc"
| 67
| March 17
| @ Atlanta
| 
| Kevin Martin (31)
| Jason Thompson (8)
| Beno Udrih (6)
| Philips Arena14,226
| 14–53
|- bgcolor="#ffcccc"
| 68
| March 18
| @ Charlotte
| 
| Rashad McCants (30)
| Jason Thompson (11)
| Beno Udrih (6)
| Time Warner Cable Arena13,594
| 14–54
|- bgcolor="#bbffbb"
| 69
| March 20
| @ New York
| 
| Kevin Martin (30)
| Spencer Hawes (13)
| Beno Udrih (7)
| Madison Square Garden19,763
| 15–54
|- bgcolor="#ffcccc"
| 70
| March 22
| Philadelphia
| 
| Francisco García (24)
| Jason Thompson (13)
| Spencer Hawes (9)
| ARCO Arena12,943
| 15–55
|- bgcolor="#ffcccc"
| 71
| March 27
| Memphis
| 
| Kevin Martin (31)
| Jason Thompson (8)
| Beno Udrih (5)
| ARCO Arena12,987
| 15–56
|- bgcolor="#bbffbb"
| 72
| March 29
| Phoenix
| 
| Jason Thompson (21)
| Spencer Hawes (10)
| Beno Udrih (7)
| ARCO Arena13,623
| 16–56
|- bgcolor="#ffcccc"
| 73
| March 31
| New Orleans
| 
| Andrés Nocioni (23)
| Beno Udrih (7)
| Beno Udrih (6)
| ARCO Arena17,317
| 16–57

|- bgcolor="#ffcccc"
| 74
| April 1
| @ Golden State
| 
| Kevin Martin (50)
| Jason Thompson (19)
| Beno Udrih (9)
| Oracle Arena18,743
| 16–58
|- bgcolor="#ffcccc"
| 75
| April 3
| @ Phoenix
| 
| Francisco García (29)
| Spencer Hawes (10)
| Beno Udrih (8)
| US Airways Center18,422
| 16–59
|- bgcolor="#ffcccc"
| 76
| April 5
| Golden State
| 
| Bobby Jackson (17)
| Andrés Nocioni (15)
| Beno Udrih (6)
| ARCO Arena12,975
| 16–60
|- bgcolor="#ffcccc"
| 77
| April 7
| L.A. Lakers
| 
| Spencer Hawes (21)
| Spencer Hawes (15)
| Beno Udrih (6)
| ARCO Arena17,317
| 16–61
|- bgcolor="#ffcccc"
| 78
| April 9
| Houston
| 
| Spencer Hawes (22)
| Spencer Hawes (11)
| Beno Udrih (5)
| ARCO Arena12,897
| 16–62
|- bgcolor="#ffcccc"
| 79
| April 10
| @ L.A. Clippers
| 
| Beno Udrih (18)
| Spencer Hawes (13)
| Beno Udrih, Spencer Hawes (4)
| Staples Center18,232
| 16–63
|- bgcolor="#ffcccc"
| 80
| April 12
| San Antonio
| 
| Spencer Hawes (24)
| Jason Thompson (11)
| Beno Udrih (6)
| ARCO Arena13,330
| 16–64
|- bgcolor="#ffcccc"
| 81
| April 13
| @ Denver
| 
| Ike Diogu (32)
| Ike Diogu (11)
| Bobby Jackson (12)
| Pepsi Center15,823
| 16–65
|- bgcolor="#ccffcc"
| 82
| April 15
| @ Minnesota
| 
| Ike Diogu (28)
| Ike Diogu (13)
| García, Udrih (5)
| Target Center17,333
| 17–65

Player statistics

Regular season 

|-
| 
| 7 || 0 || 7.9 || .500 || . || .750 || 1.4 || .0 || .1 || .3 || 2.3
|-
| 
| 47 || 1 || 14.4 || .381 || .330 || .765 || .8 || 1.9 || .3 || .0 || 5.2
|-
| 
| 10 || 1 || 14.2 || style=";"| .600 || style=";"| .500 || .758 || 3.9 || .3 || .2 || .1 || 9.2
|-
| 
| 20 || 0 || 11.4 || .341 || .270 || .933 || 1.3 || .7 || .1 || .3 || 4.2
|-
| 
| 65 || 36 || 30.4 || .444 || .398 || .820 || 3.4 || 2.3 || style=";"| 1.2 || 1.0 || 12.7
|-
| 
| 1 || 0 || 26.0 || .556 || . || 1.000 || 13.0 || 2.0 || .0 || .0 || 12.0
|-
| 
| 55 || 4 || 13.2 || .326 || .260 || .853 || 1.6 || .5 || .3 || .3 || 3.8
|-
| 
| 77 || 51 || 29.3 || .466 || .348 || .662 || 7.1 || 1.9 || .6 || style=";"| 1.2 || 11.4
|-
| 
| 71 || 10 || 20.9 || .398 || .305 || .851 || 2.8 || 2.0 || .9 || .1 || 7.5
|-
| 
| 51 || 46 || style=";"| 38.2 || .420 || .415 || .867 || 3.6 || 2.7 || style=";"| 1.2 || .2 || style=";"| 24.6
|-
| 
| 24 || 1 || 19.4 || .444 || .357 || .783 || 2.0 || 1.5 || .8 || .3 || 10.3
|-
| 
| 43 || 43 || 31.5 || .474 || .465 || .801 || style=";"| 8.0 || 3.4 || .7 || .6 || 11.9
|-
| 
| 46 || 20 || 16.2 || .521 || . || .810 || 3.3 || .6 || .3 || .3 || 3.5
|-
| 
| 23 || 16 || 31.0 || .448 || .441 || .763 || 6.0 || 1.8 || .6 || .7 || 13.7
|-
| 
| 53 || 53 || 37.4 || .472 || .418 || .823 || 4.2 || 3.7 || 1.1 || .2 || 18.3
|-
| 
| 7 || 0 || 3.3 || .000 || . || .500 || .6 || .0 || .0 || .0 || .1
|-
| 
| 14 || 0 || 12.0 || .406 || .448 || .500 || 1.5 || .7 || .5 || .0 || 5.0
|-
| 
| 8 ||0 || 7.8 || .375 || . || . || 1.9 || .1 || .8 || .1 || .8
|-
| 
| style=";"| 82 || 56 || 28.1 || .497 || .000 || .692 || 7.4 || 1.1 || .6 || .7 || 11.1
|-
| 
| 73 || style=";"| 72 || 31.1 || .461 || .310 || .820 || 3.0 || style=";"| 4.7 || 1.1 || .2 || 11.0
|-
| 
| 30 || 0 || 10.2 || .449 || .000 || .762 || 2.6 || .3 || .4 || .3 || 3.7
|}

Transactions

Free agents

Additions

Subtractions

References

Sacramento Kings seasons
Sacramento
Sacramento
Sacramento